Selgros is a  cash and carry chain in Europe, owned by Transgourmet Holding, a wholly owned subsidiary of Coop (Switzerland). It started in 1989 as a joint venture between Rewe Group (50%) and Otto Group (50%). In March 2008, Rewe took over 100% of the company, and in October 2008 formed the Transgourmet Holding company with Coop. In 2011, Coop purchased the remaining interests of Transgourmet, which included Selgros.

Operations in Europe

Romania
In Romania, Selgros owns a total of 23 hypermarkets throughout the country, with four stores in Bucharest, two stores in Constanţa, two stores in Târgu Mureş and with one store each in Timișoara,  Cluj-Napoca, Iaşi, Craiova, Arad, Oradea, Braşov, Ploieşti, Bacău, Suceava, Galaţi, Brăila, Bistrița, Baia Mare and Alba Iulia.

Poland
In Poland, Selgros has opened 19 hypermarkets, with four stores in Warsaw, Wrocław and Łódź and with one store each in  Szczecin, Gdańsk, Białystok, Bytom, Radom, Kraków, Poznań, Katowice, Lublin and Siedlce.

References

External links
 Selgros Germany
 Selgros Romania
 Selgros Poland
 Selgros Russia

Retail companies of Germany
Retail companies established in 1959
Retail companies established in 1989
Supermarkets of Germany
Supermarkets of Romania
Supermarkets of Poland
Companies based in Hesse
German brands